The Pyatt School Building is a historic school building on Old Schoolhouse Road (near United States Route 62) in Pyatt, Arkansas.  It is a single-story stone structure, with a hip roof that extended eaves and exposed rafter tails in the Craftsman style, and a Colonial Revival recessed entry sheltered by a gable-roof portico.  The school was built in 1925, as the community was adjusting to a decline of a mining boom begun in the 1910s.

The building was listed on the National Register of Historic Places in 1992.

See also
National Register of Historic Places listings in Marion County, Arkansas

References

School buildings on the National Register of Historic Places in Arkansas
Colonial Revival architecture in Arkansas
Schools in Marion County, Arkansas
National Register of Historic Places in Marion County, Arkansas
American Craftsman architecture in Arkansas
1925 establishments in Arkansas
School buildings completed in 1925